Mufaddal or al-Mufaddal is an Arabic name that may refer to:

 al-Mufaddal al-Dabbi (died –787), Arabic philologist of the Kufan school
 al-Mufaddal ibn Umar al-Ju'fi (died before 799), early Shi'i / ghulat leader and close confidant of Ja'far al-Sadiq (died 765)
 Athir al-Din al-Abhari, al‐Mufaddal ibn Umar ibn al‐Mufaddal al‐Samarqandi al‐Munajjim (died 1265 or 1262), Iranian astronomer and mathematician
 al-Mufaddal ibn Abi al-Fada'il, 14th-century Coptic Christian historian from Egypt
 Mufaddal Saifuddin (born 1946), spiritual leader and 53rd  of the Dawoodi Bohras, a subgroup of the Ismaili Shia branch of Islam

See also
, 8th-century anthology of ancient Arabic poems compiled by al-Mufaddal al-Dabbi
, 9th-century work falsely attributed to al-Mufaddal ibn Umar al-Ju'fi